Class 26 may refer to:

 British Rail Class 26, diesel-electric locomotive
 Variant of the Caledonian Railway 782 Class steam locomotive with condensing equipment
 KTM Class 26, Malaysian diesel-electric freight locomotive
 L&YR Class 26, British 2-6-2T steam locomotive
 SAR Class 26, South African 4-8-4 steam locomotive designed by David Wardale
 New South Wales Z26 class locomotive, Australian 2-6-2T steam locomotive
 SNCB Class 26, Belgian electric locomotive